Isileli Tupou also known as Kaiongo Tupou (born 26 October 1984) in Tofua, Tonga) is a rugby union player who plays at center. He currently plays with the Lille Métropole Rugby in the Federale 1 in France.

References

1984 births
Living people
Tongan rugby union players
People from Haʻapai
Rugby union centres
Tonga international rugby union players
Tongan expatriate rugby union players
Expatriate rugby union players in France
Tongan expatriate sportspeople in France